The ICF Canoe Sprint World Championships are an international event in canoe racing, one of two Summer Olympic sport events organized by the International Canoe Federation (the other being the ICF Canoe Slalom World Championships). The World Championships have taken place every non-Olympic year since 1970 and officially included paracanoe events since 2010; since 2012, paracanoe-specific editions of this event (named ICF Paracanoe World Championships) have been held in Summer Paralympic years.

Prior to November 2008, canoe sprint was known as flatwater racing.

Explanation of events
Canoe sprint competitions are broken up into  canoe (C), an open canoe with a single-blade paddle, or in kayaks (K), a closed canoe with a double-bladed paddle. Each canoe or kayak can hold one person (1), two people (2), or four people (4). When a competition is listed as a C-2 500 m event as an example, it means two people are in a canoe competing at a  distance.

Paracanoe competitions are contested in either a va'a (V), an outrigger canoe (which includes a second pontoon) with a single-blade paddle, or in a kayak (as above). All international competitions are held over 200 metres in single-man boats, with three event classes in both types of vessel for men and women depending on the level of an athlete's impairment. The lower the classification number, the more severe the impairment is – for example, VL1 is a va'a competition for those with particularly severe impairments.

Summary
 ICF Paracanoe World Championships (paracanoe events only)
 Events exclude Exhibition events.

Note
 The 2020 ICF Paracanoe World Championships were cancelled as a consequence of the COVID-19 pandemic.

Junior and U23
ICF Canoe Sprint Junior World Championships from 1985 to 2011
ICF Canoe Sprint Junior and U23 World Championships from 2013

Source:

Lists of medalists
 List of ICF Canoe Sprint World Championships medalists in men's Canadian
 List of ICF Canoe Sprint World Championships medalists in women's Canadian
 List of ICF Canoe Sprint World Championships medalists in men's kayak
 List of ICF Canoe Sprint World Championships medalists in women's kayak
 List of ICF Canoe Sprint World Championships medalists in paracanoe

Medal tables

Canoe sprint (1938–2022)
This medal table does not include exhibition events. The historical medal count of the ICF Canoe Sprint World Championships as of the 2022 championships is as follows:

Paracanoe (2010–2022)
This medal table does not include exhibition events. Events were occasionally excluded from their respective medal tables due to lack of participation, but are included in this overall table. The historical medal count of the ICF Canoe Sprint World Championships as of the 2022 championships is as follows:

Note

See also
Canoe Sprint World Cup
International Canoe Federation
ICF Canoe Marathon World Championship
ICF Canoe Slalom World Championships
Wildwater Canoeing World Championships
Malabar River Festival

References

Sources
 2008 ICF Congress on change from flatwater racing to canoe sprint. – accessed 30 November 2008.
 "The Board of Directors Wrap Up in Windsor". – International Canoe Federation (5 December 2009) – accessed 18 December 2009.

External links 

 
Recurring sporting events established in 1938
Sprint
Canoe sprint